= Reid Brothers (Glasgow) =

Scottish packaging supply business

Reid Brothers (Glasgow) Ltd is a packaging supply business based in Glasgow, Scotland. The firm was established in 1868, and was wound up as a company in around 1990. However, the name and business continue to be used as Reid Brothers UK to this current day.

== History ==
Reid Brothers expanded from their Glasgow bases, establishing branches all over the world, including Johannesburg, South Africa, Rhodesia, Zambia. The company was very well known and respected through the 19th and 20th centuries, trading worldwide. Some business activities of Reid Brothers or their shareholders included the Clyde Nail Co. Ltd and the Waverley Iron and Steel Co. Ltd. The involvement of the company overseas seems to have been centred on supplying mining and sugar cane producers. There are records showing the supply of locomotives to customers abroad.

Over time the branches were sold off until only the original Glasgow office was left. Branches were sold to Dowson & Dobson, and in 1969, AFROX purchased Reid Brothers (South Africa).

== Current business ==
As of 2015, the business was no longer a part of the Barnbury Enterprises group following a management buyout by long term director Danny Rooney. Reid Brothers continues to grow from strength to strength, they have recently launched a brand new website, displaying products and services in a catalogue style fashion, as well as launching a SureFast product line. This progressive move has placed Reid Brothers firmly within the market as leaders in plastic strapping, stainless steel banding and load securing products.
